Minosiella is a genus of ground spiders that was first described by R. de Dalmas in 1921.

Species
 it contains seven species:
Minosiella apolakia Chatzaki, 2019 – Greece (Rhodes, Karpathos)
Minosiella intermedia Denis, 1958 – Central Asia, Afghanistan, Iran
Minosiella mediocris Dalmas, 1921 (type) – Tunisia, Algeria, Egypt, Israel
Minosiella pallida (L. Koch, 1875) – Egypt, Somalia, Yemen
Minosiella perimensis Dalmas, 1921 – Yemen
Minosiella pharia Dalmas, 1921 – Libya, Egypt, Israel
Minosiella spinigera (Simon, 1882) – Yemen

References

Araneomorphae genera
Gnaphosidae
Spiders of Africa
Spiders of Asia